William Lawrence "Larry" Manahan (September 27, 1928 – March 30, 2002) was a former member of the Ohio House of Representatives, serving from 1977 to 1992. He represented the 79th District, which encompassed the North-Westernmost area of Ohio. A fiscal and social conservative, he often voted against subsidies and tax increases. However, he was in favor of green energy solutions decades before they were popular. In 1992, Manahan opted to not run for reelection.

References

1928 births
Republican Party members of the Ohio House of Representatives
2002 deaths
20th-century American politicians
People from Defiance, Ohio